Georgetown is an unincorporated community in Berkeley County, West Virginia, United States. It is located south of Little Georgetown on County Route 2.

Unincorporated communities in Berkeley County, West Virginia
Unincorporated communities in West Virginia